Neige Dias won in the final 6–3, 6–3 against Bettina Fulco.

Seeds
A champion seed is indicated in bold text while text in italics indicates the round in which that seed was eliminated.

  Sylvia Hanika (quarterfinals)
  Arantxa Sánchez (semifinals)
  Bettina Fulco (final)
  Mariana Pérez-Roldán (semifinals)
  Neige Dias (champion)
 n/a
  Sandra Wasserman (quarterfinals)
  Iva Budařová (first round)

Draw

External links
 ITF tournament edition details

Singles